Danil Aleksandrovich Karpov (born 28 June 1999) is a Russian football player who plays for FC Krasnodar and FC Krasnodar-2.

Club career
He made his debut in the Russian Football National League for FC Tyumen on 6 May 2017 in a game against FC Shinnik Yaroslavl.

On 16 June 2022, Karpov signed a three-year contract with Russian Premier League club FC Krasnodar. Karpov made his debut for Krasnodar's main squad on 31 August 2022 in a Russian Cup game against FC Khimki.

Career statistics

References

External links
 
 
 
 Profile by Russian Football National League

1999 births
People from Tyumen
Sportspeople from Tyumen Oblast
Living people
Russian footballers
Association football forwards
FC Tyumen players
FC Krasnodar-2 players
FC Krasnodar players
Russian First League players
Russian Second League players